Hope was launched in 1792 at Plymouth. In 1793 She had a successful cruise as a privateer, capturing or recapturing some five vessels. On her return to England her owners sold her and she became the Spanish packet Esperanza, sailing between England and Spain. With the outbreak of war between Britain and Spain in 1796 Esperanza disappeared from the registers.

Career
Hope first appeared in Lloyd's Register in 1793.

Although Hopes trade was London–Africa, she was not a slave ship. She apparently became a privateer. Captain Samuel "Roscon" acquired a letter of marque on 28 February 1793.

Lloyd's List reported in March 1793 that Hope, Roscow, master, had captured Generoux, of 200 tons, which had been sailing from Toulon to Brest with a cargo of wine, etc. Hope also recaptured , Adey, master, of Poole, which had been sailing from Malaga to London.

In August 1793 Lloyd's List reported that Rover, of London, Roscof, master, had captured five French Guineamen and was taking them to the West Indies. One of them, of 400 tons and quite new, was believed to be named Mirabeau. Another of the captured vessels was Egalite. Hope had captured Egalite and Mirabeau on the coast of Africa. In January 1794 Hope returned to London from Barbados.

Hope then disappeared from Lloyd's List, at last under that name. However, the 1794 volume for Lloyd's List showed an Esperaza (Spanish for "hope"), of 251 tons (bm), launched at Plymouth in 1792.

In 1796 war broke out between Britain and Spain. Esperana was last listed in the 1796 volume of Lloyd's Register.

Citations

1792 ships
Privateer ships of Great Britain
Age of Sail merchant ships of Spain